Koch is a social group (jati) in the Indian state of Assam.  The members of the caste are converts from different ethnic groups such as the Bodos, Garos, Tiwas, Karbis etc. The Koch is one of many categories in the tribe-caste continuum in Assamese society. In some instance, the identity of the Koch overlaps the identity of the Kachari. The caste is mostly found to be concentrated in Upper Assam section of the Brahmaputra Valley.

See also
Boro people
Garo people
Tiwa (Lalung)
Karbi people
Assamese people

Notes

References

Printed sources

Social groups of Assam 
Ethnic groups in South Asia
Ethnic groups in India
Indian castes